is a Japanese actress and singer from Shizuoka. She sings in "Pepesale".

Career 
On September 24, 2008, Tono made her debut as a member of the chorus unit "M". She sang the melody and low vocal parts. Her first single reached 14th on the Oricon chart. Her second single was 20th in Oricon chart, and her third single was 38th on Oricon.

On May 1, 2010, she left "M" and began her solo career as R&B singer Tono (都乃).
On April 1, 2013, she changed her solo career name to Satono.
In 2014 she joined Pepsale, as Tono (都乃). She writes songs for Pepesale and for herself as Satono.
While performing live, she began live streaming (TwitCasting and Showroom) to spread her music across the world.

She served as swing of the Toho musical Rent (2015 Japan version).

She mastered six-stage calligraphy, and was influenced by relatives who do Japanese flower arrangement and Japanese tea ceremonies.

Works

Theater 
Rent (2015) - (Director: Michael Greif) Swing

Concert (Pepesale) 
 "Cross the Banana Moon" ~ Banana Taisa Arawaru ! ~ Release Party (September 19 (Fri) 2014) Shimokitazawa Mosaic
 "Cross the Banana Moon" ~ Banana Taisa to Angou no Chizu ~ One-man live (November 9 (Sun) 2014) Shimokitazawa Mosaic
 "Sayonara Banana Taisa!" ~ Arigato Bounenkai 2014 ~ (December 27 (Sat) 2014) Nishi Ogikubo w.jaz
 "Kawasaki Street Music Battle!" V Final (March 7 (Sat) 2015) Sanpian Kawasaki
 "Oe Banana Taisa wo!" ~ Pepesale One-man Live ~ (July 11 (Sat) 2015) Takadanobaba CLUB PHASE

Radio 
 Pepesale no Radio Zettai Ryouiki (Smile FM) January 6, 2015-

Live Streaming 
 Pepesale no MHKDS Hour (TwitCasting) May 9, 2014 - Every Sunday from 23:00
 Hissatsu ! Pepesale Otoshi (Showroom) April 5, 2015 - Every Sunday from 22:00

Discography

Single CD (M) 

* Posted only for the CD when Tono was in the unit

Album CD (Pepesale)

References

External links 
 Satono Official Blog
 Satono Official Twitter
 Satono Official Facebook
 Pepesale Official Website
 Pepesale MHKDS Hour (TwitCasting)
 Hissatsu ! Pepesale Otoshi (Showroom)
 Toho Musical "Rent" Official Website
 Pepesale no Radio Zettai Ryouiki (Smile FM Official Website)
 Kawasaki Street Music Battle! Official Website
 Vocal Unit "M" Official Website

21st-century Japanese actresses
Japanese women rock singers
Living people
Musicians from Shizuoka Prefecture
Actors from Shizuoka Prefecture
Japanese women artists
21st-century Japanese singers
Year of birth missing (living people)
21st-century Japanese women singers